South Broadway Park is a neighborhood in southwestern Lexington, Kentucky, United States. Its boundaries are Bucoto Court to the north, Norfolk Southern railroad tracks to the east, South Broadway to the west, and Virginia Avenue to the south. It is located just west of the University of Kentucky.

Neighborhood statistics
 Area: 
 Population: 167
 Population density: 4,946 people per square mile
 Median household income: $24,305

External links
 http://www.city-data.com/neighborhood/S.-Broadway-Park-Lexington-KY.html

Neighborhoods in Lexington, Kentucky